is a Japanese former cyclist. He competed in the team pursuit and the points race events at the 1984 Summer Olympics.

References

1959 births
Living people
Japanese male cyclists
Olympic cyclists of Japan
Cyclists at the 1984 Summer Olympics
Sportspeople from Fukushima Prefecture